General Sir John Lionel Kotelawala  (4 April 1897 – 2 October 1980) was a Sri Lankan statesman, who served as the 3rd Prime Minister of Ceylon (Sri Lanka) from 1953 to 1956.

Born to a wealthy landholding and mining family, Kotelawala had a difficult childhood with the suicide of his father and the financial difficulties that followed. He was educated at Royal College, Colombo, and Christ's College, Cambridge, before returning to become a planter and run the family estates and mines. Kotelawala joined the Ceylon Defense Force as an volunteer officer in 1922. Being from a politically active family, he entered mainstream politics in 1931 having been elected to the State Council of Ceylon. He went on to serve as Minister of Communications and Works in the Second Board of Ministers of Ceylon. Having served as the commanding officer of the Ceylon Light Infantry, he transferred to the reserve with the rank of colonel in 1942.

With Ceylon gaining independence in 1948, he was elected to Parliament and became a member of the first Cabinet as Minister of Transport and Works. He was overlooked for the post of Prime Minister when his uncle, the first Prime Minister of Ceylon, D. S. Senanayake, died suddenly. A year later he succeeded his cousin, Dudley Senanayake, as the third Prime Minister of Ceylon, serving until his party lost the general election in 1956. Kotelawala retired from politics thereafter, going to self-imposed exile in Kent. Having donated his home, Kandawala, to the state to form a defense university, he was granted the rank of general on his deathbed.

Early life and education

Kotelawala was born on 4 April 1897 to John Kotelawala Snr, a police inspector, who later turned businessman and Alice Elisabeth Kotalawala (née Attygalle), daughter of Mudaliyar Don Charles Gemoris Attygalle, a wealthy land and mine owner. He had a younger brother Justin Kotelawala and a sister Freda, who later married C. V. S. Corea.
 

The Kotelawalas lived in considerable comfort owing to the considerable land and mine holdings of his grandfather Mudaliyar Attygalle, which his father managed following the death of his grandfather. After he was forced out of the management of the Attygalle estates by the family, Kotelawala Snr started his own business ventures including the Ceylon-Japan Trading Company. In 1907, he was arrested and found guilty of conspiring to murder his brother-in-law, Francis Attygalle. While the murder trial was underway, Kotelawala Snr committed suicide by poisoning himself.

Kotelawala was eleven years old when his father died and with this, the family fortunes declined after much funds were spent in the legal defence of his father. Alice Kotelawala who had converted to Christianity slowly built up the family wealth through careful management of their remaining land holdings and the share of the Kahatagaha graphite mine, which she received from her younger sister Ellen and brother-in-law, Fredrick Richard Senanayake. She was reputed for her social work and was later awarded a MBE in the 1939 Birthday Honours and a CBE in the 1951 Birthday Honours.

Young Kotelawala attended Royal College, Colombo, representing the school in cricket, tennis, boxing and football. He played in the Royal–Thomian. He had to leave owing to involvements in the riots in 1915, embarking on a tour of Europe, with World War I raging. He remained in Europe for five years, spending most of that time in England and France, and attended Christ's College, Cambridge to study agriculture. Kotelawala was known as an aggressive and outspoken man who loved sports, horseback riding and cricket and, particularly as a young man, got into physical fights when he was insulted. He was fluent in Sinhala, English and French. After returning to Ceylon, he became a planter, running his family plantation estates and mines, which included the Kahatagaha Graphite Mine in Dodangaslanda. He served as a Justice of the Peace.

Military service
In a time when serving in the volunteer forces was prestigious and a gentlemanly pursuit, Kotelawala gained a commission as a second lieutenant in the Ceylon Light Infantry on 15 September 1922. That year the regiment received colours from the Prince of Wales. He progressed with promotions to lieutenant on 27 October 1924, captain on 23 August 1929 and major on 1 October 1933. On 1 July 1939, he was appointed second in command of the Ceylon Light Infantry and served till 1 September 1940. He was promoted to the rank of lieutenant colonel on 1 October 1940 and was posted to the reserve of the regiment.

With the outbreak of World War II in the Far East, the Ceylon Defence Force including the Ceylon Light Infantry was mobilized and expanded for wartime service with the British Army. Kotelawala as the Minister of Communications and Works, became a member of the Ceylon's War Council and served as the Commander-in-Chief of the Essential Services Labor Corp. He provided his home, Kandawala to function as the officers mess for the wartime RAF station at Rathmalana. He was promoted to honorary rank of colonel on 2 July 1942, the highest rank that a Ceylonese could achieve at the time in the Ceylon Defence Force.

Early political career

As early as 1915 Kotelawala had become involved with political leaders such as Don Stephen Senanayake and his brother F.R. Senanayake, who was married to Kotelawala's mother's sister. They criticized many of the actions of the British colonial officials following the riots in 1915.

State Council 
Captain John Kotelawala contested the Kurunegala seat in the 1931 election for the State Council of Ceylon. He gained 17159 votes, a majority of 9045 over his opponent from the Ceylon National Congress. Elected to the State Council, he served as a backbencher in its first term. He was re-elected unopposed in the 1936 state council election from Kurunegala and was elected as Minister of Communications and Works, the chair Communications and Works Committee in the Second Board of Ministers of Ceylon. As the Minister, he oversaw the initiation of several major public works projects in the island.

In Cabinet

Just before Ceylon received independence and dominion status in 1948, Colonel Kotelawala had contested the 1947 general elections for the United National Party (UNP), founded by D. S. Senanayake, from the Dodangaslanda electorate and was elected to the newly formed House of Representatives, which was the elected lower house of parliament established under the Soulbury Constitution. Kotelawala was an important member of the UNP and was appointed by Senanayake as Minister of Transport and Works, retaining the portfolio of public works which he had held on the second board of ministers.

During his tenure major projects such as the Laxapana power project, expansion of the Colombo harbour, expansion of the Ratmalana Airport, construction of the University of Peradeniya and the expansion of road in the island took place. With S. W. R. D. Bandaranaike leaving the UNP and crossing over to the opposition, Kotelawala was appointed Leader of the House in the House of Representatives on 12 July 1951.

When Senanayake suddenly died on 22 March 1952, Kotelawala expected to succeed him as Prime Minister, given he was the leader of the house and the most senior member of the UNP. However, to his great anger, Lord Soulbury, the Governor-General, appointed Senanayake's son and Kotelawala's younger cousin, Dudley Senanayake, as Prime Minister on 26 March 1952. An angry Kotelawala threatened resignation and a possible split in the party appeared. After mediation between Kotelawala and Senanayake by senior UNP members including Sir Oliver Goonetilleke, Kotelawala agreed to serve in Dudley Senanayake's cabinet, retaining his existing portfolio. Soon after Senanayake called for fresh elections and in the 1952 general elections, Kotelawala was re-elected and retained his ministry and the post of leader of the house as the UNP won a majority to form a government.

The following year, the Senanayake government faced major civil unrest with left-wing parties launching the 1953 Hartal in August. On 12 August 1953 civil disobedience, strikes and demonstrations started throughout the island by trade unions against the proposed elimination of the subsidy on rice by the government. The country came to a stand still with transport and communication stopping due to acts of sabotage. The government implemented emergency regulations and deployed the army to suppress the Hartal and restore order. Badly shaken by the events of the Hartal, Senanayake, who was gravely ill, resigned as Prime Minister on 12 October 1953. Kotelawala succeeded Senanayake as Prime Minister, Minister of Defense, Minister of External Affairs, and as leader of the UNP.

Prime minister

Domestic policy
His government partially retained the rice subsidy which led to the 1953 Hartal. An ardent anti-communist, he took a hardline stand against trade unions and left-wing parties. He formed the Ceylon Railway Engineer Corps and Post and Telegraph Signals to minimise the effects on transport and communication in the event of trade union action.

He hosted Queen Elizabeth II and the Duke of Edinburgh in Ceylon during their Royal Commonwealth Tour in April 1954, using the occasion to request the appointment of a Ceylonese Governor-General when Lord Soulbury's tenor ended. This came to be when Sir Oliver Goonetilleke was appointed Governor-General in July 1954. Kotelawala himself was appointed to the Imperial Privy Council during the visit.

Foreign policy

As prime minister, Kotelawala led Sri Lanka into the United Nations and contributed to Sri Lanka's expanding foreign relations, particularly with other Asian countries. In 1955 he led his country's delegation to the Bandung conference in Indonesia where his performance earned him the epithet Bandung Booruwa (Bandung Donkey) in Sri Lanka, for his lack of knowledge of the presence of the US 7th Fleet in the South China Sea, and his inability to pronounce "Formosan". His uncontroversial first speech at the conference was written by journalists at the Lake House group, However, he had been influenced by the British Government, as well as by his US-aligned permanent secretary Gunasena de Soyza to make anti-Communist remarks. He made these remarks at a press conference but subsequently withdrew them. He confessed later in Parliament that he had only made these remarks because he was pressured by de Soyza. At the conference he stated his belief that fashionably Marxist anti-imperialist rhetoric ignored Communist atrocities. In a private conversation with the prime ministers of Pakistan, India, Burma, and China, he asked the Chinese premier Zhou Enlai if he wanted to bring Communism to Tibet. Zhou replied that it was impractical and undesirable and that the PRC had gone to Tibet because it was "an integral part of the Chinese state" and because it had historically been threatened by "imperialist intrigues" from the British Empire and Imperial Russia.

Electoral defeat
His government had to deal with economic problems and ethnic tensions. Although his parliamentary term was valid till 1957, he had the Governor General to dissolve Parliament in 1956, calling for fresh elections. However, the UNP faced a major defeat in the 1956 general elections by a group of more radically chauvinistic Sinhalese parties under the leadership of Solomon Bandaranaike which formed a coalition called the Mahajana Eksath Peramuna, which had noncomplete agreements with other leftist parties. Of the 76 candidates fielded by the UNP only eight were elected to parliament, resulting in a humiliating defeat which made the UNP a minority in the opposition.

Final years in Parliament
Kotelawala retained his parliamentary seat having been reelected from the Dodangaslanda electorate, however, he did not attend parliament often since Dr N. M. Perera had become the Leader of the Opposition. He returned the party leadership to Dudley Senanayake and left the island. He did not contest the 1960 general elections, instead, he supported the candidacy of A. U. Romanis, his personal chauffeur, as the UNP candidate for Dodangaslanda. Romanis won both general elections in 1960 and remained a member of parliament till 1964.

Later life
Kotelawala retired from politics shortly after his electoral defeat. He bought the Brogues Wood estate at Biddenden in Kent, where he lived for several years. He eventually returned to Ceylon. When the post of Governor-General appeared vacant with the completion of William Gopallawa's first term, he was hopeful that he would be nominated to the post by the United National Party which was in the government at the time. However Dudley Senanayake in his second term as Prime Minister did not name a successor for Gopallawa and allowed him to have a second term.

Defence university
Kotelawala was a strong supporter of the military and maintained close links with the army. He was the first Chairman of the Ceylon Light Infantry Association in 1974 and was the President of the Ceylon Ex Servicemen's Association from 1948 to his death. In 1978, the commanders of the armed forces identified a need to establish a Defence university to cater to the academic training of its officers. Although the government approved it, funds were limited and no location was provided by the government. In 1979, Lieutenant General Denis Perera, Commander of the Sri Lankan Army approached Kotelawala with the proposal of donating his home Kandawala and its 50 acres estate to the state to establish a Defence university. Six months later in 1980, having reviewed the proposal and consulted his heirs, Kotelawala agreed to donate Kandawala following his death. Shortly after he signed a deed of gift with the President, transferring Kandawala and a formal ceremony to establish the institution was scheduled for 11 October 1980.

Death
On 29 September 1980, he suffered a stroke at Kandawala and was taken to the cardiac unit of the Colombo General Hospital. On 1 October, President J. R. Jayewardene visited Kotelawala and conferred on him the honorary rank of a General of the Volunteer Force of the Army in recognition for his long service to the country, which was acknowledged by Kotelawala who was on his deathbed. The honor was planned to be awarded on 11 October at the ceremony establishing the proposed Defense Academy.

He died on 2 October 1980 at the Colombo General Hospital. On 5 October, Kotelawala's coffin which was kept at Kandawala was moved to Parliament House to lay in state, before final rites at Independence Square with full military honours.

Personal life
He married Effie Manthri Dias Bandaranaike, daughter of F. H. Dias Bandaranaike and Maria Frances Dias Bandaranaike nee Senanayake, sister of Don Stephen Senanayake. Although the marriage was not successful, ending in divorce, it produced a daughter, Lakshmi Kotelawala, who married Henry Gerald Kotalawala.

Kotelawala was known for his flamboyance and the company he kept. He would entertain guests at his home in Kandawala and his cottage in Nuwara Eliya. Even as Prime Minister he resided at Kandawala.

Legacy
In 1985 a national defence academy for the training of officers for all three Sri Lankan defence services was established at his estate Kandawala, which he had left to the country in his will for this purpose. It has been named General Sir John Kotelawala Defence University (KDU) is a defence university offering undergraduate and postgraduate study courses to officers of the defence services in Sri Lanka in various disciplines. Statues of Sir John Kotelawala have been erected in many parts of the island, including one at the Old Parliament Building, Colombo. Many schools, libraries and public buildings have been named in his honour. In 1993, the Sir John Kotelawala Museum was opened in Kandawala by the President.

Titles and honours

His Orders, Decorations, Medals and other memorabilia are on display at the General Sir John Kotelawala Defence University.

Appointments
 Member of the Privy Council (1954)

Honorary military appointments
 General of the Volunteer Force of the Army (1980)
  Colonel of the Ceylon Defense Force (1942)

Decorations and Medals

Educational
 LLD (honorary) – University of Ceylon
 LLD (posthumously) – General Sir John Kotelawala Defence University

Electoral history

See also
Kotelawala cabinet
List of political families in Sri Lanka
General Sir John Kotelawala Defence University
Ceylon Light Infantry

Notes

References

External links

The Kotelawala Ancestry
Attygalle Family Tree
Website of the Parliament of Sri Lanka
Official Website of General Sir John Kotelawala Defence University
Official Website of United National Party
 PLAYING THE GAME WITH - SIR JOHN 
Sir John Kotelawala's early years
Amara Samara in Sinhala
Sir John Kotelawala in Sinhala 
Sir John Kotelawala in Sinhala
Sir John Kotelawala in Sinhala 
Sir John Kotelawala's work
General The Rt.Hon. Sir John Lionel Kotelawala PC CH KBE KStJ LLD

1897 births
1980 deaths
Prime Ministers of Sri Lanka
Defence ministers of Sri Lanka
Transport ministers of Sri Lanka
Communications ministers of Sri Lanka
Ceylonese members of the Privy Council of the United Kingdom
Members of the Senate of Ceylon
Members of the 1st State Council of Ceylon
Members of the 2nd State Council of Ceylon
Members of the 1st Parliament of Ceylon
Members of the 2nd Parliament of Ceylon
Members of the 3rd Parliament of Ceylon
Sri Lankan justices of the peace
Leaders of the United National Party
Sri Lankan mining businesspeople
Sri Lankan Buddhists
Sinhalese politicians
Sinhalese military personnel
Sri Lankan full generals
Ceylonese colonels
Ceylonese military personnel of World War II
Ceylon Light Infantry officers
Sri Lanka Army Volunteer Force officers
Ceylonese Members of the Order of the Companions of Honour
Ceylonese Knights Commander of the Order of the British Empire
Ceylonese Knights Bachelor
Grand Croix of the Légion d'honneur
Knights Grand Cross of the Order of Merit of the Italian Republic
Grand Crosses 1st class of the Order of Merit of the Federal Republic of Germany
Grand Cordons of the Order of the Rising Sun
Knights of Justice of the Order of St John
People from British Ceylon
Alumni of Christ's College, Cambridge
Alumni of Royal College, Colombo